Kota Kuala Muda is a small town in Kedah state, Malaysia. Near the town is Pantai Merdeka (Merdeka Beach). Kota Kuala Muda is also one of the sub-districts (mukims) of Kuala Muda District in Kedah state.

Kota Kuala Muda was affected by flooding in 1990.

References

Towns in Kedah